Methyl methanesulfonate-sensitivity protein 22-like also known as MMS22-like, DNA repair protein is a protein that in humans is encoded by the MMS22L gene.

Model organisms				

Model organisms have been used in the study of MMS22L function. A conditional knockout mouse line, called Mms22ltm1a(EUCOMM)Wtsi was generated as part of the International Knockout Mouse Consortium program — a high-throughput mutagenesis project to generate and distribute animal models of disease to interested scientists.

Male and female animals underwent a standardized phenotypic screen to determine the effects of deletion. Twenty six tests were carried out on mutant mice and two significant abnormalities were observed. No homozygous mutant embryos were identified during gestation, and therefore none survived until weaning. The remaining tests were carried out on heterozygous mutant adult mice; no additional significant abnormalities were observed in these animals.

References

Further reading 
 
 
 
 
 
 
 

Genes mutated in mice